is a Greek camp Jupiter trojan roughly  in diameter that was briefly listed on the Sentry Risk Table in April 2021 when JPL transitioned to DE441. Once the new astrometry was verified and published it was removed from the Sentry Risk Table on 4 May 2021.

When  had a short observation arc of 3 days, some orbit solutions suggested it could be a near-Earth object that was discovered when it was near aphelion 7 AU from the Sun. As a result of the possible near-Earth orbit, the Sentry Risk Table listed a non-significant 1:1-billion chance of impacting Earth on 12 October 2059.

Notes

References

External links 
 VI (virtual impactor) date of 2059-10-12 at 0.5AU (Wayback Machine archive)
 Minor Planet Mailing List (MPML) discussion (April 2021)

 

Minor planet object articles (unnumbered)

Near-Earth objects removed from the Sentry Risk Table
20140302